Paradoxipus orzeliscoides is a species of tardigrade. It is the only species in the genus Paradoxipus, part of the family Halechiniscidae and the subfamily Orzeliscinae. The species has been found in the coastal waters of the southeastern United States, in the western part of the Atlantic Ocean. The genus and the species were named and described by Reinhardt Kristensen and Robert P. Higgins in 1989.

References

Further reading
Kristensen & Higgins, 1989: "Marine Tardigrada from the southeastern United States coastal waters. 1. Paradoxipus orzeliscoides n. gen., n. sp. (Arthrotardigrada: Halechiniscidae)".  Transactions of the American Microscopical Society, vol. 108, no. 3, p. 262-282.

Halechiniscidae
Endemic fauna of Florida
Animals described in 1989
Taxa named by Reinhardt Møbjerg Kristensen
Taxa named by Robert P. Higgins
Tardigrade genera
Monotypic protostome genera